Akademgorodok (Krasnoyarsk) is a major scientific center of Siberia; located in the west of the city Krasnoyarsk (Russia). Built during the Soviet times, it was conceived as a healthier, privileged enclave for academics to live in, among trees and vegetation and outside of the dirtier industrial areas.

History

The oldest institute, Forest Institute was established in 1944. The Institute of Physics was established in 1956 by academician L. V. Kirensky. The Institute of Computational Modeling SB RAS was established in  1975. The Institute of Biophysics was established in 1981.

Main science centers of Academgorodok
Krasnoyarsk Akademgorodok is home to more than 20 research institutions and organizations. The most prominent are:
Institute of Forest of SB RAS
Institute of Physics of SB RAS
Institute of Computational Modeling of SB RAS
Institute of Biophysics of SB RAS
Institute of Chemistry of SB RAS

Also:
Central science library – contains more than 500 000 books
House of Scientists

See also
Krasnoyarsk

External links

Krasnoyarsk Science Center

Krasnoyarsk
Buildings and structures in Krasnoyarsk Krai
Naukograds
Science and technology in Siberia